Cnephasia alticola is a species of moth of the family Tortricidae. It is found in the Russian Far East (Primorsky Krai).

References

Moths described in 1966
alticola
Moths of Asia